The sooty-faced finch (Arremon crassirostris) is a species of bird in the family Emberizidae. Until recently, it was placed in the genus Lysurus.

It is found in the Talamancan montane forests and the Serranía del Darién. Its natural habitat is subtropical or tropical moist montane forests.

References

sooty-faced finch
Birds of the Talamancan montane forests
sooty-faced finch
Taxonomy articles created by Polbot